Trichius gallicus is a beetle species belonging to the family Scarabaeidae, subfamily Cetoniinae. It frequently appears in the literature under the name "Trichius rosaceus", but this name is permanently unavailable under ICZN Article 11.4, as are all of Voet's names.

 These beetles are present in most of Europe, they are about 10 millimeters long and can be encountered from May through July feeding on flowers.

The sides of the chest and the back of the abdomen are covered with a pubescence, hence the popular name of Bee beetle of Trichius species. Head and pronotum are black, while the elytra are yellowish, crossed by a few black bands.

The first black band usually does not reaches the scutellum, other bands are incomplete and the second has a rectangular form. The color of hair usually is more orange-red compared to Trichius fasciatus. Median tibiae are without teeth. In male only the penultimate abdominal segment has a band of white hairs.

Subspecies
Trichius gallicus gallicus Dejean, 1821 
Trichius gallicus zonatus Germar, 1831

References

Cetoniinae
Beetles of Europe
Beetles described in 1821